K201 or K-201 may refer to:

K-201 (Kansas highway), a former state highway in Kansas
JTV-519, a 1,4-benzothiazepine derivative known as K201